Tomba may refer to:

Tomba!, a 1997 PlayStation video game
Tomba! 2: The Evil Swine Return, a 1999 PlayStation video game
Tomba (Meitei name)
Dongba script
Tomba, Montenegro, a small town
Alberto Tomba, an Italian alpine skier